The Cornelius XBG-3 was an American "bomb glider", developed by the Cornelius Aircraft Corporation for the United States Army Air Forces. Using an unconventional design that included a forward-swept wing, a single prototype was ordered in 1942; however the contract was cancelled later that year before the aircraft had been constructed.

History
Early in the Second World War, the United States Army Air Forces initiated research into the possibility that gliders, towed by other, conventional aircraft to the area of a target, then released and guided to impact via radio control, could be a useful weapon of war. Essentially an early form of (very large) guided missile, the concept was similar to a Navy project underway at the same time, known as Glomb (from "glider-bomb"), and led to the establishment of the 'BG' series of designations, for 'Bomb Glider', in early 1942.

Among the designs considered for use as a bomb glider was an unconventional design submitted by the Cornelius Aircraft Company. Cornelius, having established a reputation for unconventional aircraft designs, proposed a design that featured a "tail-first" configuration, with canard foreplanes and a radical forward-swept wing. The USAAF considered the design interesting enough to award a contract to Cornelius for the construction of a single prototype, designated XBG-3. However the project was cancelled in late 1942, when the bomb glider concept was abandoned by the USAAF.

An enlarged, tailless, forward-swept wing glider would be built by Cornelius later in the war, acting as a "flying fuel tank" for long-range bombers, as the XFG-1.

See also

References
Citations

Bibliography

BG-3
Unmanned aerial vehicles of the United States
Forward-swept-wing aircraft
Canard aircraft
Cancelled military aircraft projects of the United States
World War II guided missiles of the United States
Glider aircraft